Salvatore "Turi" Ferro (10 January 1921 – 10 May 2001) was an Italian film, television and stage actor. He is considered the most important actor in the Sicilian theatre post-World War II era.

Life and career
Born in Catania, Ferro launched his own theatrical company in 1953 alongside his wife, actress Ida Carrara. He later staged a great number of works by Sicilian authors. He was one of the co-founders of the Teatro Stabile di Catania. His stage credits include works directed by Roberto Rossellini and Giorgio Strehler. 

From the early 1970s he started appearing in RAI Television, in appreciated and successful TV-series. His film career is less prolific (he appeared in only 33 films between 1962 and 1998), but includes notable roles in popular titles as the Mafioso of The Seduction of Mimi and "Ignazio" of Malizia. In 1974 he received a special David di Donatello for "the value and success of his performances".

The film director Lina Wertmüller referred to him as "the greatest Sicilian actor after Angelo Musco". He died of a myocardial infarction.

Partial filmography

 A Man for Burning (1962) - Don Vincenzo
 Extraconiugale (1964) - Padre di Renato (segment "La moglie svedese")
 I Knew Her Well (1965) - Il commissario
 Rita the Mosquito (1966) - Sicilian professor
 Don't Sting the Mosquito (1967)
 Seven Times Seven (1968) - Bernard
 Un caso di coscienza (1970) - Judge
 Scipio the African (1971) - Giove Capitolino
 The Case Is Closed, Forget It (1971) - Chef of Prison Guards
 The Sicilian Checkmate (1972) - Judge Nicola Altofascio
 Chronicle of a Homicide (1972) - Commissario Malacarne
 The Seduction of Mimi (1972) - Don Calogero / Vico Tricarico / Salvatore Tricarico
 Malicious (1973) - Ignazio
 La governante (1974) - Leopoldo Platania
 Virility (1974) - don Vito
 Il lumacone (1974) - Gianni
 Vergine e di nome Maria (1975) - Don Vito
 I baroni (1975) - Il barone Leopoldo Lalumera
 Che notte quella notte! (1977) - Maurizio
 Stato interessante (1977) - Domenico La Monica (second story)
 Blood Feud (1978) - Vito Acicatena
 Ernesto (1979) - Carlo Wilder
 The Turn (1981) - Don Diego Alcozér
 La posta in gioco (1988) - Prosecutor Mario Bellomo
 Malizia 2mila (1991) - Ignazio / Husband
 You Laugh (1998) - Dottor Ballarò (segment "Due sequestri")

References

Further reading

External links

1921 births
2001 deaths
20th-century Italian male actors
Actors from Catania
David di Donatello winners
Italian male film actors
Italian male stage actors
Italian male television actors